Chinare or CHINARE may refer to:

 Chenareh, a city in Iran.
 China Re, a Chinese insurance company.
 CHINARE, the abbreviated expedition names used by Chinese Arctic and Antarctic Administration for both Arctic and Antarctic:
 Chinese National Arctic Research Expedition 
 Chinese National Antarctic Research Expedition